The 2015–16 Primera División de Fútbol Profesional season (also known as the Liga Pepsi) is the 18th season and 35th and 36th tournament of El Salvador's Primera División since its establishment of an Apertura and Clausura format. Isidro Metapán and Santa Tecla were the defending champions of the Apertura and Clausura, respectively. The league will consist of 12 teams. There will be two seasons conducted under identical rules, with each team playing a home and away game against the other clubs for a total of 22 games per tournament. At the end of each half-season tournament, the top 8 teams in that tournament's regular season standings will take part in the playoffs. The champions of Apertura and Clausura will both qualify for the 2016–17 CONCACAF Champions League. Should the same team win both tournaments, the runners-up with the best aggregate record will qualify for the Champions League.

Team information 

A total of 12 teams will contest the league, including 9 sides from the Clausura 2014 and 3 promoted from the 2014–15 Segunda División.

The 2015 season features the addition of two extra sides from the Segunda División de Fútbol Salvadoreño. These were decided based on how good the club infrastructure, fan base and lastly if they secured the 100,000 dollar Primera División license 

C.D. Atlético Marte were relegated to 2015–16 Segunda División the previous season.

The relegated team was replaced by the 2014–15 Segunda División playoffs promotion winner. Real Destroyer won the Clausura 2015 title, this led to take part of the promotion playoffs along with the Apertura 2014 champions side C.D. Guadalupano. Real Destroyer won the playoffs by the score of 5–2.

Promotion and relegation 

Promoted from Segunda División de Fútbol Salvadoreño as of June, 2015.

 Champions: Real Destroyer

Relegated to Segunda División de Fútbol Salvadoreño as of June, 2015.

 Last Place: Atlético Marte (However, purchased new spot in the Primera División)

Franchises 

The 2015–16 Primera División de Fútbol Profesional season features the increase of two additional sides, Atlético Marte and C.D. Chalatenango.
Both clubs were the only teams that nominated themselves (which included a 100,000 payment) and as such were accepted.

Further Changes 

Real Destroyer later sold their spot to C.D. Sonsonate for 75,000 dollars.

Firpo purchased the spot of Juventud Independiente after the end of the Apertura season. Although the club will play under their own colours, flags, jersey, stadium, coaching staff, directors and players, they were forced to be registered under the name and have the same points as Juventud Independiente.

Stadia and locations

Personnel and sponsoring

Managerial changes

Before the start of the season

During the Apertura season

Between Apertura and Clausura seasons

During the Clausura season

Apertura 2015

League table

Positions by round 

This table lists the positions of teams after each week of matches. In order to preserve the chronological evolution, any postponed matches are not included to the round at which they were originally scheduled, but added to the full round they were played immediately afterwards. For example, if a match is scheduled for matchday 3, but then postponed and played between days 6 and 7, it will be added to the standings for day 6.

Results 

The home team is listed in the left-hand column.Colours: Blue = home team win; Yellow = draw; Red = away team win.

Scoring 

 First goal of the season:  Ivan Mancia for Santa Tecla against Juventud Independiente, 21 minutes (August 1, 2015)
 First goal by a foreign player:  Neymer Miranda for Pasaquina against Sonsonate, 57 minutes (August 1, 2015)
 Fastest goal in a match: 2 minutes
  Elman Rivas for UES against Santa Tecla (August 15, 2015)
  José Barahona for Juventud Independiente against Águila (September 27, 2015)
 Goal scored at the latest point in a match: 90+4 minutes
  Cristian Cisneros for Isidro Metapán against Chalatenango (August 1, 2015)
 First penalty Kick of the season:  Nicolás Muñoz for Águila against Dragón, 89 minutes (August 3, 2015)
 Widest winning margin: 5 goals
 Isidro Metapán 5–0 Juventud Independiente (September 30, 2015)
 Isidro Metapán 5–0 Santa Tecla (October 24, 2015)
 Santa Tecla 6–1 Chalatenango (November 14, 2015)
 FAS 0–5 Santa Tecla (November 22, 2015)
 First hat-trick of the season:  Williams Reyes for Águila against Juventud Independiente (September 27, 2015)
 First own goal of the season:  Mario Martínez (Atlético Marte) for Dragón (August 16, 2015)
 Most goals in a match: 7 goals
 Isidro Metapán 3–4 Alianza (August 9, 2015)
 Sonsonate 3–4 Alianza (September 26, 2015)
 Santa Tecla 5–2 Alianza (September 30, 2015)
 Santa Tecla 6–1 Chalatenango (November 14, 2015)
 Most goals by one team in a match: 6 goals
 Santa Tecla 6–1 Chalatenango (November 14, 2015)
 Most goals in one half by one team: 4 goals
 Santa Tecla 5–2(1–2) Alianza (2nd half, September 30, 2015)
 Most goals scored by losing team: 3 goals
 Isidro Metapán 3–4 Alianza (August 9, 2015)
 Sonsonate 3–4 Alianza (September 26, 2015)
 Most goals by one player in a single match: 3 goals
  Williams Reyes for Águila against Juventud Independiente (September 27, 2015)
  David Rugamas for Isidro Metapán against Juventud Independiente (October 1, 2015)
  Irvin Herrera for Santa Tecla against Chalatenango (November 14, 2015)
  Luis Hinestroza for Santa Tecla against FAS (November 22, 2015)

Club 

 Most clean sheets: Isidro Metapán
 11
 Fewest clean sheets: Sonsonate
 3
 Best Home record during the Apertura season: Santa Tecla
 26 out of 33 points (8 wins, 2 draws, and 1 loss)
 Worst Home record during the Apertura season: UES
 8 out of 33 points (1 win, 5 draws, and 5 losses)
 Best Away record during the Apertura season: Alianza
 18 out of 33 points (5 wins, 3 draws, and 3 losses)
 Worst Away record during the Apertura season: Juventud Independiente
 6 out of 33 points (1 win, 3 draws, and 7 losses)
 Highest scoring team: Santa Tecla
 47 goals
 Lowest scoring team: UES
 13 goals

Discipline 

 First yellow card of the season:  Álvaro Guardado for Juventud Independiente against Santa Tecla, 47 minutes (August 1, 2015)
 First red card of the season:  William Maldonado for Santa Tecla against Juventud Independiente, 78 minutes (August 1, 2015)
 Most yellow cards by a player: 8
  Rudy Valencia (Alianza)
  Jimmy Valoyes (Águila)
 Most red cards by a player: 3
  Bladimir Osorio (Dragón)

Attendances 

Ranked from highest to lowest average attendance.

Top goalscorers

Hat-tricks

Playoffs

Quarter-finals

First leg

Second leg 

1–1 on aggregate. Isidro Metapán advanced as the higher seeded team.

Águila won 2–0 on aggregate.

Alianza won 4–3 on aggregate.

FAS won 2–1 on aggregate.

Semifinals

First leg

Second leg 

FAS won 2–1 on aggregate.

Alianza won 3–2 on aggregate.

Final

Clausura 2016 

Results and statistics listed in the Clausura season for Juventud Independiente are actually those of Firpo, which purchased the spot at the end of the Apertura season but was forced to register as Juventud.

League table

Positions by round 

This table lists the positions of teams after each week of matches. In order to preserve the chronological evolution, any postponed matches are not included to the round at which they were originally scheduled, but added to the full round they were played immediately afterwards. For example, if a match is scheduled for matchday 3, but then postponed and played between days 6 and 7, it will be added to the standings for day 6.

Results 
Updated to games played on February 28, 2016.The home team is listed in the left-hand column.Colours: Blue = home team win; Yellow = draw; Red = away team win.

Scoring 

 First goal of the season:  Marcos Rodríguez for Sonsonate against Pasaquina, 15 minutes (January 16, 2016)
 First goal by a foreign player:  Oscar Móvil for Sonsonate against Pasaquina, 52 minutes (January 16, 2016)
 Fastest goal in a match: 6 minutes
  Luis Hinestroza for Santa Tecla F.C. against Pasaquina (February 13, 2016)
 Goal scored at the latest point in a match: 90+5 minutes
  Meme González (pen.) for Dragón against Atlético Marte (January 31, 2016)
 First penalty Kick of the season:  Erick Molina for Atlético Marte against FAS, 76 minutes (January 17, 2016)
 Widest winning margin: 8 goals
 Santa Tecla F.C. 8–0 Pasaquina (February 13, 2016)
 First hat-trick of the season:  Williams Reyes for Juventud Independiente against FAS (January 23, 2016)
 First own goal of the season:  Miguel Solís (Chalatenango) for Juventud Independiente, 12 minutes (January 31, 2016)
 Most goals in a match: 8 goals
 Santa Tecla F.C. 8–0 Pasaquina (February 13, 2016)
 Most goals by one team in a match: 8 goals
 Santa Tecla F.C. 8–0 Pasaquina (February 13, 2016)
 Most goals in one half by one team: 5 goals
 Santa Tecla F.C. 8–0 Pasaquina (1st half, February 13, 2016)
 Most goals scored by losing team: 2 goals
 Dragón 3–2 Chalatenango (February 10, 2016)
 Most goals by one player in a single match: 3 goals
  Williams Reyes for Juventud Independiente against FAS (January 23, 2016)

Club 

 Most clean sheets: C.D. Águila
 12
 Fewest clean sheets: Atlético Marte
 3
 Best Home record during the Clausura season: C.D. Águila
 27 out of 33 points (8 wins, 3 draws, and 0 loss)
 Worst Home record during the Clausura season: Atlético Marte
 7 out of 33 points (2 wins, 1 draw, and 8 losses)
 Best Away record during the Clausura season: Santa Tecla F.C.
 21 out of 33 points (5 wins, 6 draws, and 0 losses)
 Worst Away record during the Clausura season: UES
 3 out of 33 points (1 win, 0 draws, and 10 losses)
 Highest scoring team: Santa Tecla F.C.
 45 goals
 Lowest scoring team: Atlético Marte
 16 goals

Discipline 

 First yellow card of the season:  Oscar Móvil for Sonsonate against Pasaquina, 48 minutes (January 16, 2016)
 First red card of the season:  Mario Martínez for Sonsonate against Pasaquina, 72 minutes (January 16, 2016)
 Most yellow cards by a player: TBD
 TBD (TBD)
 Most red cards by a player: TBD
 TBD (TBD)
 Most yellow cards by a club: 75
 Atletico Marte
 Most red cards by a club: '8
 C.D. FAS and C.D. Pasaquina

Attendances

Top goalscorers

Hat-tricks

Playoffs

Quarter-finals

First leg

Second leg 

Dragón won 3–2 on aggregate.

Águila won 4–1 on aggregate.

Alianza won 1–0 on aggregate.

Santa Tecla won 6–2 on aggregate.

Semi-finals

First leg

Second leg 

Dragón won 1–0 on aggregate.

Águila won 3–1 on aggregate.

Final

Aggregate table 

If the same team wins both Apertura and Clausura tournaments, the higher ranked runner-up team in the aggregate table will earn the second qualification position to 2016–17 CONCACAF Champions League.

Positions by round 

This table lists the positions of teams after each week of matches. In order to preserve the chronological evolution, any postponed matches are not included to the round at which they were originally scheduled, but added to the full round they were played immediately afterwards. For example, if a match is scheduled for matchday 3, but then postponed and played between days 6 and 7, it will be added to the standings for day 6.

List of foreign players in the league 

This is a list of foreign players in the 2015–16 season. The following players:

 Have played at least one game for the respective club.
 Have not been capped for the El Salvador national football team on any level, independently from the birthplace

A new rule was introduced this season, that clubs can have five foreign players per club (though two have to be from Central America) and can only add a new player if there is an injury or a player/s is released.

Águila
  Eder Arias 
  Jhony Rios 
  Jimmy Valoyes
  Miguel Curiel
  Keithy Simpson 
  Héctor Ramos

Alianza
  Iván Garrido
  Oscar Guerrero
  Jonathan Philippe 
  Willis Plaza

Atlético Marte
  Nestor Asprilla 
  Wésley Brasilia 
  Cristian Mosquera
  Sebastián Gutiérrez 
  Nicolás Céspedes

Chalatenango
  Bladimir Díaz
  Christian Vaquero 
  Kordell Samuel 
  Pablo Hütt 

Dragón
  John Machado 
  Héctor Lemus 
  Jackson de Oliveira
  Allan Muraldo
  Bryan Lanzeni

FAS
  Josimar Moreira 
  Walter Martínez 
  Mauricio Mendoza 
  Jonathan Lezcano  
  Lucas Vico 

Firpo (Clausura)* 
  Eder Arias
  Jhony Rios
  Maikon Palacios

Juventud Independiente (Apertura)
  Nixon Restrepo
  Jefferson Viveros

Isidro Metapán
  Andrés Angulo 
   David López
  Romeo Parkes
  Michael López

Pasaquina
  Devaughn Elliott 
  Glaúber da Silva 
  Neymer Miranda
  Manuel Lucero
  Gustavo Guerreño

Sonsonate
  Fredy Gonzales 
  Augusto Do Carmo 
  William Guerrero
  Fernando Gallo
  Oscar Móvil

Santa Tecla
  Martín Giménez 
  Luis Hinestroza
  Ricardinho
  Joel Almeida

UES
  Raphael Alves 
  Carlos Ceballos 
  Augusto Do Carmo 
  Weslie John
  Mckauly Tulloch

 (player released during the Apertura season)
 (player released between the Apertura and Clausura seasons)

References 

Primera División de Fútbol Profesional seasons
El Salvador
1